The 1930 Women's World Games (Czech and Slovak III Ženské Světové Hry v Praze, French 3è Jeux Féminins Mondiaux ) were the third regular international Women's World Games, the tournament was held between September 6 - September 8 at the Letná Stadium in Prague.

Events
The games were organized by the Fédération Sportive Féminine Internationale under Alice Milliat as a response to the IOC decision to include only a few women's events in the 1928 Olympic Games.

The games were attended by 200 participants from 17 nations, there among: Austria, Belgium, Czechoslovakia, France, Germany, Great Britain (16 athletes), Italy, Japan (6 athletes), Latvia, Netherlands, Poland, Sweden and Switzerland. Canada attended with a basketball team.

The athletes competed in 12 events: running (60 metres, 100 metres, 200 metres, 800 metres, 4 x 100 metres relay and hurdling 80 metres), high jump, long jump, discus throw, javelin, shot put and triathlon (100 metres, high jump and javelin). The tournament also held exhibition events in football, basketball, handball, fencing, shooting and canoeing.

The tournament was opened with an olympic style ceremony. The games attended an audience of 15,000 spectators and several world records were set.

On September 8 the sole basketball match was played between Canada (Team West) and France (Team Europe), Canada won by 18-14.

Medal summary

A special commemorative medal was issued for the participants.

Points table

References

External links
 Participation medal
 Picture British team
 Picture Canadian basketball team
 Picture Czechoslovak team

Women's World Games
International athletics competitions hosted by Czechoslovakia
Sports competitions in Prague
1930 in athletics (track and field)
1930 in Czechoslovak sport
Multi-sport events in Czechoslovakia
Women's World Games
1930s in Prague
1930 in women's sport
September 1930 sports events